The Whitsunday Islands are 74 continental islands of various sizes off the central coast of Queensland, Australia,  north of Brisbane. The northernmost of the islands are off the coast by the town of Bowen, while the southernmost islands are off the coast by Proserpine. The island group is centred on Whitsunday Island, while the commercial centre is Hamilton Island.  The traditional owners of the area are the Ngaro people and the Gia people, whose Juru people has the only legally recognised native title in the Whitsunday Region.

The islands are within the locality of Whitsundays and the local government Whitsunday Region. In 2009, as part of the Q150 celebrations, the Whitsunday Islands became one of the Q150 Icons of Queensland for their role as a natural attraction.

Naming
On Sunday 3 June 1770, (the day Whitsun—Pentecost was celebrated on the Christian calendar) Captain James Cook sailed his ship H.M.B. Endeavour, through a broad expanse of islands which provided an unimpeded passage to the north. Cook named the passage "Whitsundays' Passage". Cook's recorded times and dates are often questioned. Time quoted is simply local time (calculated at Noon), the Date recorded is a little more confusing. Cook recorded Marine Time (PM comes before AM or GMT+12 hours). Considering the International Date Line, and knowing today's date on the East Coast of Australia is calculated at GMT+10 - Cook's recorded date is fortuitously correct.

There is some contention as to exactly which islands are within the informally named Whitsunday Islands, in particular those at the southern extremity and the inclusions to the west.  What is certain is that they lie within the chain named Cumberland Isles by Captain Cook (now officially the Cumberland Islands) and a reasonably defined section of that chain and surrounding waters have become known worldwide as The Whitsundays, based on a contraction of the Whitsunday Islands designation.

Tourism
The Whitsunday islands are a popular tourist destination for travellers to Queensland and the Great Barrier Reef with the area being one of the most popular yachting destinations in the Southern Hemisphere. The islands received about 700,000 visitors between March 2008 and March 2009.

The Whitsunday Ngaro Sea Trail is a mix of seaways and short walks, crossing South Molle, Hook and Whitsunday islands.  The tracks across the islands are linked by seaways suited to kayaking, sailing or powerboating.  Camping is available at eight camping areas on the three islands. Several islands have large resorts, offering a wide variety of accommodation and activities. Chartering a yacht or bareboating is a popular way to explore the seaways, beaches and coves.

The Ngaro Whitsundays Underwater Art Trail  is a series on sculptures of Turtle, Manta ray, Maori wrasse, Coral polyp and a traditional piece named Bywa. They are located in shallow water depths assessable for snorkelling.

Components
There are a total of 74 islands and islets among all the groups in the Whitsundays.

Whitsunday group
The most notable islands in the main Whitsunday group are named Dent, Hamilton, Hayman, Hook and Whitsunday which features the white sands of Whitehaven Beach.

Lindeman group
The best known island in the Lindeman group is its namesake Lindeman Island. However the largest island in the group is Shaw Island.

Molle group
The most notable islands in the Molle group are Daydream Island (formerly West Molle Island), Long Island and South Molle Island.

Northern group
Some of the islands in the Northern group are Armit, Gloucester and Saddleback.

Table of islands
Listed below are islands of The Whitsundays, divided by group locality. Named rocks and islets can be found listed within the entry for the nearest island to that feature.

See also

 List of islands of Australia
 Regions of Queensland
 Tourism in Australia
 Whitsunday Islands National Park

References

External links

 Whitsunday Regional Council
 Whitsunday Islands at NASA Earth Observatory
 Whitsunday National Park islands: Nature, culture and history

 
Regions of Queensland
Islands of Queensland